The 2007–08 Football Superleague of Kosovo season, also known as the Raiffeisen Superleague of Kosovo for sponsorship reasons with Raiffeisen The campaign began on 25 August 2007, and ended on 1 June 2008. Raiffeisen Superliga season 2007–08 was organized by the Football Federation of Kosovo and the division had a 16-team format. The clubs play each other twice (home and away) during the season for a 30-match schedule. At the end of the season, the bottom three teams in the division were relegated to the second division of football in Kosovo, First Football League of Kosovo.

FC Prishtina won the title for the third time since the end of the war, and the seventh time since the breakup of Yugoslavia.

Teams
Sixteen teams of Football Superleague of Kosovo season 2007–08 and their position at the end of the season:

League table

Relegation 

Promotion from Liga e Parë to Raiffeisen Superliga for 2008–09 season have secured: KF Istogu, KF Ferizaj and KF Ulpiana.

Results

References and notes 

Football Superleague of Kosovo seasons
Kosovo
1